Sticky George is the third studio album by English pop band, The Korgis. It was released on Rialto Records in the UK in 1981.

The album includes the singles "That Was My Big Mistake", "All the Love in the World", "Don't Say That It's Over" and "Sticky George" - some released as The Korgis and others James Warren & The Korgis.

Sticky George was re-issued on CD by Edsel Records in 1999.

The album was followed by the non-album single "Don't Look Back" (produced by Trevor Horn)/"Xenophobia", released on London Records in June 1982. Both tracks are included on the 2003 compilation Don't Look Back - The Very Best of The Korgis.

Track listing
Side A:
"Sticky George" (Harrison, Warren) - 3:36 
"Can't We Be Friends Now" (Warren) - 4:01 
"Foolishness of Love" (Harrison) - 3:31 
"Domestic Bliss" (Gordon, Harrison, Warren) - 3:15 
"That Was My Big Mistake" (Davis, Warren) - 4:37

Side B: 
"Nowhere to Run" (Davis, Warren) - 4:15
 N.B. 1999 CD: Alternate version - 5:17. Original version available on compilations Archive Series and Greatest Hits. 
"Contraband" (Warren) - 3:18 
"All the Love in the World" (Davis, Warren) - 4:12 
"Don't Say That It's Over" (Warren) - 2:50 
"Living on the Rocks" (Warren) - 3:32

Personnel
 James Warren - vocals, piano, bass guitar
 Stuart Gordon - guitar, banjo, violin, percussion, background vocals
 Phil Harrison - electric piano, keyboards, synthesizer, drums, spoons

Additional personnel
 David Lord - keyboards
 Manny Elias - drums
 Jerry Marotta - drums
 The Korgettes (Sheena Power & Jo Mullet) - backing vocals on tracks A5 and B5
 Steve Buck - flute on track B2
 Dave Pegler - clarinet on track B2
 Chantelle Samuel - bassoon on track B2
 Stephanie Nunn - oboe on track B2
 Huw Pegler - horn on track B2

Production
 James Warren - producer
 David Lord - producer, sound engineer, wind and strings arranger
 Nick Heath - direction
 Jeffrey Edwards - cover painting
 Peter Ashworth - photography
 Nick Heath, George Rowbottom - art direction
 Recorded December 1980 - February 1981, at Crescent Studios, Bath.

Release history
 1981 LP Rialto Records TENOR 103 (UK)
 1999 CD Edsel Records EDCD 623

Single releases
 "That Was My Big Mistake" (Edit) - 4:01 / "Can't We Be Friends Now" ('James Warren & The Korgis', Rialto TREB 134, April 1981)
 "All The Love In The World" (Edit) - 3:38 / "Intimate" (The Korgis, TREB 138, June 1981)
 "Don't Say That It's Over" (Single Version) - 2:47 / "Drawn And Quartered" (The Korgis/'James Warren & The Korgis', TREB 142, September 1981)
 "Sticky George" / "Nowhere To Run" ('James Warren & The Korgis', Rialto 101 470 France, 1981)
 "Don't Look Back" (Warren) 4:16 / "Xenophobia" (Warren) - 2:30 (Non-album single, London Records LON 7, June 1982)
 "Don't Look Back" / "Xenophobia" (Pic disc, London Records LONPD 7, June 1982)

References

1981 albums
The Korgis albums